Kindsbach is a municipality in the district of Kaiserslautern, in Rhineland-Palatinate, western Germany.

Notable people
Paul Westrich (born 1947), insect specialist
Peter Immesberger (born 1960), weight lifter

References

Municipalities in Rhineland-Palatinate
Palatinate Forest
Kaiserslautern (district)